Linus Airways was a regional airline in Indonesia. It served large city destinations, such as Pekanbaru, Medan, Semarang, Palembang, Batam and Bandung. The airline name is an abbreviation of "Lintasan Nusantara" ("bridge across the archipelago").

Founded in 2004 and started operations in 2008, the airline started operation just one month after the demise of Adam Air, which was heavily embroiled in corruption and safety violation which caused financial problems and ceased operation on that year from many accidents or incidents. Linus officially started operation from Jakarta to Batam in July 2008.

The airline was on the List of air carriers banned in the European Union. Linus Airways is not listed in any category by the Indonesian Civil Aviation Authority for airline safety quality, because this airline is not operating for longer.

In May 2009, the airline decided to suspend all of its operations due to financial problems.

Fleet
As of 2008, Linus Airways operated the following aircraft:
2 BAe 146-200

References

External links

Linus Airways
Linus Airways (Aviation Network, June 8, 2008)
Linus Airways BAe 146-200 PK-LNJ at Medan - Polonia (MES / WIMM), July 25, 2008
Linus Airways BAe 146-200 PK-LNI and PK-LNJ at Jakarta Soekarno-Hatta International Airport, March, 2008
Linus Airways BAe 146-200 PK-LNJ at Jakarta Soekarno-Hatta International Airport, March 21, 2008
Linus Airways Boeing 737-200 Advanced PK-LYA at Honolulu International (HNL/ PHNL), USA - Hawaii, March 30, 2005 (leased to other operator)
Linus Airways - Details and Fleet History

 

Defunct airlines of Indonesia
Airlines established in 2008
Airlines disestablished in 2009
Indonesian companies established in 2008
2009 disestablishments in Indonesia